Eugénie-Emilie Juliette Folville (5 January 1870 – 28 October 1946) was a Belgian pianist, violinist, music educator, conductor and composer.

Life 
Eugénie-Emilie Juliette Folville was born in Liège, Belgium, and began the study of music with her father who was a lawyer and amateur musician. She studied violin with Charles Malherbe, Ovide Musin and César Thomson and made her debut in Liège in 1879. She had a successful career on the concert stage, and in 1897 took a position teaching piano at the Royal Conservatory of Liège.

She lived for several years in London, and during World War II she lived and performed in Bournemouth. She died in Dourgne on 28 October 1946.

Works 
Folville composed for theater, solo instruments, orchestra, chorus, and chamber ensemble. Selected works include:

Orchestral works 

 Scènes champêtres. 1re Suite d'orchestre, op. 9 (1885) : Aux Champs, Dans la montagne, Rêverie, Fête de village
 Scènes de la mer. 2e Suite d'orchestre, op. 14 (1886) : Chanson du pêcheur, Nuit étoilée, Mer phosphorescente, Flots agités, Adieux à l'océan
 Scènes d'hiver. 3e Suite d'orchestre, op. 17 (1887) : Ballade, La neige, Noël, Carnaval
 Violin concerto in G Minor, op. 20 (1888)
 Piano concerto in D Minor (1902–1903)
 Concerstück for cello and orchestra (1905)
 Impressions d'Ardenne, orchestral suite (1910)
 Triptyque for violin and orchestra, or piano (ca. 1935)

Chamber and piano works 

 Souvenir de Mozart. 1re Sonatine (op. 7, 1881) and 2e Sonatine (op. 11, 1882)
 Berceuse for violin and piano, op. 24 (1890)
 En Ardenne. Esquisses pour piano (ca. 1910)
 1er Quatuor pour piano, op. 9 (1885)
 Berceuse for cello and quartet accompaniment [s.d.]
 Poème for cello and piano, or orchestra (ca.1908-1909)
 Mazurka for violin and piano (1910)
 Communion for organ (1912)
 Verset sur le thème du «Tantum», 6e ton for organ (1912)

Choral and vocal works 
Chants printaniers (1883–84)
Atala. Drame lyrique en deux actes (1891), libretto by Paul Collin. Creation at the Grand Théâtre de Lille on 3 March 1892.
Ewa. Légende Norwégienne, cantate pour soli, chœurs et accompagnement d'orchestre (ca. 1889), poem by Paul Collin.
Noce au Village, op. 13 (1886), for solo, choir and orchestra, words by Paul Collin.
Jean de Chimay. Drame lyrique en quatre actes, libretto by Alfred Billet, unfinished.

References

Further reading 

 Fauve BOUGARD, "Le morceau sera signé J. Folville". Juliette Folville (1870–1946). Compositrice et interprète. Itinéraire d'une femme dans la Belgique musicale. Master thesis in musicology, Université libre de Bruxelles (Belgium), dir. Valérie Dufour, 2018.

External links 
 
 Verset sur le thème du «Tantum», 6e ton for organ played by Andrew Pink

1870 births
1946 deaths
20th-century classical composers
Belgian music educators
Women classical composers
Belgian classical composers
Belgian opera composers
Musicians from Liège
Women classical violinists
Women classical pianists
Women opera composers
Women music educators
20th-century women composers
20th-century women pianists